Budekwa is a Ward from Maswa District in Simiyu Region, Tanzania.

In 2016 the Tanzania National Bureau of Statistics report there were 8,245 people in the ward, from 13,630 in 2012. The ward has .

References

Maswa District
Simiyu Region